Ezequiel Barrionuevo (born August 14, 1986) is an Argentine footballer who last played for Gimnasia y Tiro of the Torneo Argentino A in Argentina.

External links
 
 

1986 births
Living people
Argentine footballers
Argentine expatriate footballers
Santiago Wanderers footballers
Gimnasia y Esgrima de Jujuy footballers
Talleres de Córdoba footballers
Villa Mitre footballers
Primera B de Chile players
Expatriate footballers in Chile
Association football midfielders
Sportspeople from Córdoba Province, Argentina